Two ships of the Royal Australian Navy (RAN) have been named HMAS Geelong, for the city of Geelong, Victoria.
, a Bathurst-class corvette launched in 1941 and lost after colliding with an American tanker in 1944
, a Fremantle-class patrol boat launched in 1984 and decommissioned in 2006

Battle honours
Ships named HMAS Geelong are entitled to carry two battle honours:
 Pacific 1942–44
 New Guinea 1944

References

Royal Australian Navy ship names